Gustav Dörr (5 October 1887 – 11 December 1928) was a German World War I fighter pilot credited with 35 victories. He went on to become one of the world's first airline pilots.

Early life and infantry service
Gustav Dörr was born on 5 October 1887 in Blindgallen, East Prussia, the son of a building contractor. He completed trade school and began work at age 18 with Krupp AG. In 1908, he enlisted in Infanterie-Regiment 176, and was promoted to non-commissioned officer.

In August 1914, with the start of World War I, he was recalled. On 20 August 1914, he was seriously wounded, taking until November to recover. Upon his return he fought in actions along the Rawka River near Warsaw. During an attack on 17 February 1915, he was bayoneted in his right hip. This wound put him in the garrison hospital at Naumburg. He was incapacitated for front line duty, and was recommended for service in the reserve battalion of his regiment.

Aerial service
Dörr saw a circular from the War Ministry asking for volunteers for pilot training. Dörr applied and was accepted despite his physical condition and relatively advanced age. He reported for training with Fliegerersatz-Abteilung 2 at Döberitz in July 1915 and later at Fliegerersatz-Abteilung 3 in Gotha.

On 18 March 1916, he was posted as a Vizefeldwebel to Flieger-Abteilung 68; an artillery observation unit engaged in artillery spotting. One of his comrades there was future ace Ernst Udet. 

Dörr and his observer Oberleutnant Serger were transferred to Flieger-Abteilung 6 to help counter heavy Allied air pressure. He stayed with the unit through its redesignation as Flieger-Abteilung 257 in May 1916, and participated in air operations prior to the Battle of the Somme in July. Dörr earned an Iron Cross Second Class while assigned to Flieger-Abteilung 6; it was awarded on 7 April 1916. He would subsequently receive the First Class Iron Cross on 17 April 1917.

In June 1917, the elevator on Dörr's plane failed in flight, and he crashed from an altitude of 1400 meters (4,600 feet). His observer, Leutnant Bohn, was killed; Dörr survived with his jaw broken in six places. This serious injury kept him out of action for three months. Upon recovery, he was trained as a fighter pilot.

Dörr returned to duty at Fliegerersatz-Abteilung 1 as a test pilot from November 1917 until February 1918. He was then transferred from flying two seaters into Jagdstaffel 45, a fighter squadron. His first victory was in a dogfight that saw six Germans tackle 26 French and British machines. Dörr shot down a Sopwith 1½ Strutter on 17 March 1918.

He downed a French Breguet 14 on 28 May, only to be shot down in flames by others in the formation. Fortunately, his altitude was only 400 meters (1,300 feet); he crash landed in no man's land between the French and German trenchworks with minor burns and made it back to German lines under heavy fire.

Dörr claimed an unconfirmed victory only three days later and added three confirmed claims for the rest of June. In July, he logged eleven more victories, scoring consistently and increasingly often through the month. August added six more victories, bringing his total to 23. On 29 August, he was awarded the Gold Military Merit Cross; this was the enlisted man's equivalent of the better-known Pour le Merite or "Blue Max" given to officers. 

September saw seven confirmed victories—three Spad VIIs and four Spad XIs. Dörr's tally now stood at 30. He was also commissioned as a leutnant in September. The exact date is uncertain, but with his 24th and 25th victims falling on the 2nd, Dörr had at least 23 victories when he became an officer.
Once commissioned, he was eligible for officer's decorations. At the time, the minimum requirement for an flier winning the Pour le Merite was 20 victories. Dörr was well past that total and capable of adding to his score.

On 25 October, he was finally proposed for the Pour le Merite. Two days later, he scored his 34th victory and had another unconfirmed claim. Another probable came the next day. His last victory of the war, his 35th, came on 30 October 1918. On 4 November, he had a third indecisive bout.<ref>Franks,Bailey,Guest 1993, pp. 100-101</reOn

Gustav Dörr would not receive the Blue Max. The Kaiser abdicated without approving his award.

Victories

After the war
Gustav Dörr became one of the world's original commercial airline pilots after the war. He flew  for Deutsche Luft Hansa.

On 11 December 1928, he was piloting a Junkers G 31 on a night flight from Cologne to Berlin. He attempted an emergency landing at Letzlinger Heide. His plane brushed a tree on final approach and crash landed. Spilled fuel caught fire and killed Dörr and his crew. Luft Hansa later commemorated him by naming one of its airliners after him.

References

Source

 

1887 births
1928 deaths
Aviators killed in aviation accidents or incidents in Germany
German World War I flying aces
Lufthansa people
Luftstreitkräfte personnel
People from East Prussia
People from Gołdap County
Prussian Army personnel
Recipients of the Iron Cross (1914), 1st class
Recipients of the Pour le Mérite (military class)